Toyin Abraham Ajeyemi  (born Olutoyin Aimakhu; 5 September 1982) is a Nigerian actress and filmmaker.

Career 
Abraham started acting in 2003 when Nigerian actress Bukky Wright came to Ibadan to shoot a movie. Abraham has made, directed, and starred in several Nigerian films including Alani Baba Labake and Ebimi ni. During the 2013 Best of Nollywood Awards, Toyin Abraham was nominated for Best Supporting Actress in a Yoruba Film titled Ebimi ni, alongside Joke Muyiwa, who was nominated for Best Lead Actress in a Yoruba film titled Ayitale. Abraham also starred in the movie, Black Val. Martini Animashaun, the CEO of Tinimash Entertainment, created and managed her reality show titled, Keeping Up With Toyin Aimakhu.

In 2020, Abraham was made the ambassador for Revolution Plus Properties, a Lagos-based property outfit.

Selected filmography 
Alani Baba labake (2013)
Ebi mi ni (2013)
Alakada (2013)
Okafor's Law (2016)
What Makes you Tick (2016)
Love is in the Hair (2016)
Alakada Reloaded (2017)
Esohe (2018)
Hakkunde (2017)
Mentally (2017)
Tatu (2017)
London Fever (2017)
Wives on Strike: The Revolution (2017)
Celebrity Marriage (2017) featuring Tonto Dikeh, Felix Ugo Omokhodion , and Jackie Appiah
The Ghost and the Tout (2018)
Seven and Half Dates (2018)
Disguise (2018)
What just happened (2018)
Elevator Baby (2019)
Don't Get Mad, Get Even (2019)
Made in Heaven (2019)
Two Weeks in Lagos (2019)
The Millions (2019)
Kasanova (2019)
Bling Lagosians (2019)
Nimbe (2019)
Diamonds In The Sky (2019)
Fate of Alakada (2020)
Dear Affy (2020)
Small Chops (2020)
Sola Fe Pami
Shadow Parties (2020)
Kambili (2020)
Fate of Alakada (2020)
Aki and Pawpaw
The Prophetess (2021)
The Therapist (2021)
Day of Destiny (2022)
King of Thieves (2022)
The stranger I know (2022)
The wildflower (2022)
 Ijakumo (2022)

Awards and nominations

See also 
List of Nigerian film producers
List of Yoruba people

References

External links 

Living people
Nigerian film actresses
Yoruba actresses
Nigerian film directors
Nigerian women film directors
Nigerian film producers
Actresses in Yoruba cinema
21st-century Nigerian actresses
Olabisi Onabanjo University alumni
Actresses from Edo State
People from Auchi
St Anne's School, Ibadan alumni
1982 births